The Storia della letteratura italiana (History of Italian Literature) is an essay written by Italian literary critic Francesco de Sanctis, published by Morano in two volumes in 1870 and 1871.

It is considered the first truly complete, organic treatment of Italian literature as a whole.

Subdivision
The Storia della letteratura italiana consists of the following 20 chapters (the last two are somewhat shorter and less in-depth, due to pressure the publisher put on De Sanctis to complete the work):

Volume I
I–II – Sicilian and Tuscan literature
III (Lirica di Dante) – poetry of Dante Alighieri
IV – 13th century poetry
V ("Mysteries and visions") – primitive chivalry literature and Holy Bible
VI – 14th century
VII (La Commedia) – Dante's influence
VIII – Petrarch's Il Canzoniere
IX – Giovanni Boccaccio's Decameron
X (Il trecentista) – Franco Sacchetti's work
XI (Le stanze) – 15th century (Leon Battista Alberti, Angelo Poliziano, Lorenzo il Magnifico, Luigi Pulci, Matteo Maria Boiardo, Giovanni Pontano)
XII – 16th century
Volume II
XIII – Ludovico Ariosto's L'Orlando furioso
XIV – Teofilo Folengo
XV – Machiavelli and Francesco Guicciardini
XVI – Pietro Aretino
XVII – Torquato Tasso
XVIII – Giambattista Marino and the Academy of Arcadia
XIX (La nuova scienza) – Metastasio, Carlo Goldoni, Giuseppe Parini, Vittorio Alfieri, ugo Foscolo and Alessandro Manzoni

Italian literature